Corymbia 'Summer Red' is a cultivar of Corymbia, bred for a large mass of bright red flowers. It is a hybrid of C. ficifolia and C. ptychocarpa. It can grow to a height of five metres.

References 

Summer Red
Cultivars of Australian plants
Myrtales of Australia
Trees of Australia
Ornamental plant cultivars